Isaiah the Solitary (? – 11 August 491), also known as Isaiah of Gaza, Isaias or Isaiah the Solitary, Abba Isaiah, or possibly also Isaiah of Scetis, was a Christian ascetic and monastic writer known from the Sayings of the Desert Fathers and various Palestinian Miaphysite sources. He is canonized as a saint by the Coptic Orthodox Church, with his feast day on the 11th day of the month Abib (Epip) in the Coptic calendar.

His work "On Guarding the Intellect" can be found in the Philokalia.

Life 
Isaiah the Solitary lived in asceticism on a mountain in Egypt then moved to Palestine.

Although he was active in Gaza (as he was quoted by Barsanuphius of Gaza), Isaiah was a product of the Egyptian monasticism which had developed in the 4th century in the Kellia (Cells) of the desert of Scetes, where he was first a monk. He lived in Egypt during the early 400s.

Much of Isaiah's writings were instructive for monks and solitaries. Very few of his writings are extant, as the majority of them have been destroyed by Muslims.

Isaiah was also influential in bringing Christianity to Palestine.

He died as a hermit in a monastery near Gaza on 11 August 491.

Writings 
Many of Isaiah's works have been lost. The Asceticon, a collection of about 30 discourses on Christian asceticism, was especially popular in the Eastern Orthodox monastic tradition, and has survived in many translations in Syriac (6th century), Coptic (6th century), Ethiopic (8th century, translation from Coptic), Armenian (8th century), Arabic, and Georgian (of which only logoi 3, 7, 23, and 27 have survived). The Syriac version of his Asceticon, which is only a partial translation of the original Greek text, has been translated into French.

Excerpts of his writings are also included in the Philokalia.

Isaiah of Scetis 
Some scholars suggest that Isaiah of Gaza and Isaiah of Scetis were in fact two different people, with the Asceticon first written by Isaiah of Scetis (d. early 5th century) and later edited by Isaiah of Gaza (d. 491).

References

Further reading 
 Chryssavgis, John. "Abba Isaiah of Scetis: Aspects of Spiritual Direction," Studia Patristica 35 (2001): 32–40.
 Chryssavgis, John and Penkett, Robert. "Abba Isaiah of Scetis: Ascetic Discourses." Cistercian Publications (2002). .
 Chitty, Derwas J. "Abba Isaiah." Journal of Theological Studies n.s. 22 (1971): 47–72.
 Regnault, Lucien. "Isaïe de Scété ou de Gaza." In Dictionnaire de spiritualité ascétique et mystique: doctrine et histoire, 7:2083–2095. Paris: G. Beauchesne et ses fils, 1932–1995.
 Regnault, Lucien. "Isaïe de Scété ou de Gaza? Note critiques en marge d'une introduction au probleme iasïen." Revue d'ascétique et mystique 46 (1970): 33–44.

Byzantine writers
Byzantine saints
5th-century births
491 deaths
Hermits
Egyptian Christian monks
Coptic Orthodox saints
Desert Fathers
Philokalia